The M1911 (Colt 1911 or Colt Government) is a single-action, recoil-operated, semi-automatic pistol chambered for the .45 ACP cartridge. The pistol's formal U.S. military designation as of 1940 was Automatic Pistol, Caliber .45, M1911 for the original model adopted in March 1911, and Automatic Pistol, Caliber .45, M1911A1 for the improved M1911A1 model which entered service in 1926. The designation changed to Pistol, Caliber .45, Automatic, M1911A1 in the Vietnam War era. 

Designed by John Browning, the M1911 is the best-known of his designs to use the short recoil principle in its basic design. The pistol was widely copied, and this operating system rose to become the preeminent type of the 20th century and of nearly all modern centerfire pistols. It is popular with civilian shooters in competitive events such as the International Defensive Pistol Association and International Practical Shooting Confederation.

The U.S. military procured around 2.7 million M1911 and M1911A1 pistols during its service life. The pistol served as the standard-issue sidearm for the United States Armed Forces from 1911 to 1985. It was widely used in World War I, World War II, the Korean War, and the Vietnam War. The M1911A1 was replaced by the adoption of the 9mm Beretta M9 pistol as the standard U.S. military sidearm in 1985.  However, the U.S. Army did not replace the M1911A1 with the Beretta M9 until October 1986, and due to the M1911's popularity among users, it has not been completely phased out.  Modernized derivative variants of the M1911 are still in use by some units of the U.S. Army Special Forces, U.S. Marine Corps and the U.S. Navy.

History

Early history and adaptations
The M1911 pistol originated in the late 1890s as the result of a search for a suitable self-loading (or semi-automatic) pistol to replace the variety of revolvers then in service.  The United States was adopting new firearms at a phenomenal rate; several new pistols and two all-new service rifles (the M1892/96/98 Krag and M1895 Navy Lee), as well as a series of revolvers by Colt and Smith & Wesson for the Army and Navy, were adopted just in that decade. The next decade would see a similar pace, including the adoption of several more revolvers and an intensive search for a self-loading pistol that would culminate in the official adoption of the M1911 after the turn of the decade.

Hiram S. Maxim had designed a self-loading rifle in the 1880s, but was preoccupied with machine guns. Nevertheless, the application of his principle of using cartridge energy to reload led to several self-loading pistols in 1896. The designs caught the attention of various militaries, each of which began programs to find a suitable one for their forces. In the U.S., such a program would lead to a formal test at the turn of the 20th century.

During the end of 1899 and start of 1900, a test of self-loading pistols, including entries from Mauser (the C96 "Broomhandle"), Mannlicher (the Mannlicher M1894), and Colt (the Colt M1900), was conducted.

This led to a purchase of 1,000 DWM Luger pistols, chambered in 7.65mm Luger, a bottlenecked cartridge.  During field trials, these ran into some problems, especially with stopping power. Other governments had made similar complaints.  Consequently, DWM produced an enlarged version of the round, the 9×19mm Parabellum (known in current military parlance as the 9×19mm NATO), a necked-up version of the 7.65 mm round. Fifty of these were tested as well by the U.S. Army in 1903.

American units fighting Tausūg guerrillas in the Moro Rebellion in Sulu during the Philippine–American War using the then-standard Colt M1892 revolver, .38 Long Colt, found it to be unsuitable for the rigors of jungle warfare, particularly in terms of stopping power, as the Moros had high battle morale and often used drugs to inhibit the sensation of pain. The U.S. Army briefly reverted to using the M1873 single-action revolver in .45 Colt caliber, which had been standard during the late 19th century; the heavier bullet was found to be more effective against charging tribesmen. The problems prompted the Chief of Ordnance, General William Crozier, to authorize further testing for a new service pistol.

Following the 1904 Thompson-LaGarde pistol round effectiveness tests, Colonel John T. Thompson stated that the new pistol "should not be of less than .45 caliber" and would preferably be semi-automatic in operation. This led to the 1906 trials of pistols from six firearms manufacturing companies (namely, Colt, Bergmann, Deutsche Waffen und Munitionsfabriken (DWM), Savage Arms Company, Knoble, Webley, and White-Merrill).

Of the six designs submitted, three were eliminated early on, leaving only the Savage, Colt, and DWM designs chambered in the new .45 ACP (Automatic Colt Pistol) cartridge.  These three still had issues that needed correction, but only Colt and Savage resubmitted their designs. There is some debate over the reasons for DWM's withdrawal—some say they felt there was bias and that the DWM design was being used primarily as a "whipping boy" for the Savage and Colt pistols, though this does not fit well with the earlier 1900 purchase of the DWM design over the Colt and Steyr entries.  In any case, a series of field tests from 1907 to 1911 were held to decide between the Savage and Colt designs.  Both designs were improved between each round of testing, leading up to the final test before adoption.

Among the areas of success for the Colt was a test at the end of 1910 attended by its designer, John Browning. 6000 rounds were fired from a single pistol over the course of 2 days.  When the gun began to grow hot, it was simply immersed in water to cool it. The Colt gun passed with no reported malfunctions, while the Savage designs had 37.

Service history
Following its success in trials, the Colt pistol was formally adopted by the Army on March 29, 1911, when it was designated "Model of 1911", later changed in 1917 to "Model 1911", and then "M1911" in the mid-1920s. The Director of Civilian Marksmanship began manufacture of M1911 pistols for members of the National Rifle Association in August 1912. Approximately 100 pistols stamped "N.R.A." below the serial number were manufactured at Springfield Armory and by Colt.  The M1911 was formally adopted by the U.S. Navy and Marine Corps in 1913. The .45 ACP "Model of 1911 U.S. Army" was used by both US Army Cavalry troops and infantry soldiers during the United States' Punitive Expedition into Mexico against Pancho Villa in 1916.

World War I
By the beginning of 1917, a total of 68,533 M1911 pistols had been delivered to U.S. armed forces by Colt's Patent Firearms Manufacturing Company and the U.S. government's Springfield Armory.  However, the need to greatly expand U.S. military forces and the resultant surge in demand for the firearm in World War I saw the expansion of manufacture to other contractors besides Colt and Springfield Armory, including Remington-UMC and North American Arms Co. of Quebec. Several other manufacturers were awarded contracts to produce the M1911, including the National Cash Register Company, the Savage Arms Company, the Caron Brothers Manufacturing of Montreal, the Burroughs Adding Machine Co., Winchester Repeating Arms Company, and the Lanston Monotype Company, but the signing of the Armistice resulted in the cancellation of the contracts before any pistols had been produced.

Interwar changes
Battlefield experience in World War I led to some more small external changes, completed in 1924. The new version received a modified type classification, M1911A1, in 1926 with a stipulation that M1911A1s should have serial numbers higher than 700,000 with lower serial numbers designated M1911. The M1911A1 changes to the original design consisted of a shorter trigger, cutouts in the frame behind the trigger, an arched mainspring housing, a longer grip safety spur (to prevent hammer bite), a wider front sight, a shortened hammer spur, and simplified grip checkering (eliminating the "Double Diamond" reliefs). These changes were subtle and largely intended to make the pistol easier to shoot for those with smaller hands. No significant internal changes were made, and parts remained interchangeable between the M1911 and the M1911A1.

Working for the U.S. Ordnance Office, David Marshall Williams developed a .22 training version of the M1911 using a floating chamber to give the .22 long rifle rimfire recoil similar to the .45 version. As the Colt Service Ace, this was available both as a pistol and as a conversion kit for .45 M1911 pistols.

Before World War II, 500 M1911s were produced under license by the Norwegian arms factory Kongsberg Vaapenfabrikk, as Automatisk Pistol Model 1912. Then, production moved to a modified version designated Pistol Model 1914 and unofficially known as "Kongsberg Colt". The Pistol M/1914 is noted for its unusual extended slide stop which was specified by Norwegian ordnance authorities. 22,000 were produced between 1914 and 1940 but production continued after the German occupation of Norway in 1940 and 10,000 were produced for the German armed forces as Pistole 657 (n). 

Between 1927 and 1966, 102,000 M1911 pistols were produced as Sistema Colt Modelo 1927 in Argentina, first by the Dirección General de Fabricaciones Militares. A similar gun, the Ballester–Molina, was also designed and produced.

The M1911 and M1911A1 pistols were also ordered from Colt or produced domestically in modified form by several other nations, including Brazil (M1937 contract pistol), Mexico (M1911 Mexican contract pistol and the Obregón pistol), and Spain (private manufacturers Star and Llama).

World War II
World War II and the years leading up to it created a great demand. During the war, about 1.9 million units were procured by the U.S. Government for all forces, production being undertaken by several manufacturers, including Remington Rand (900,000 produced), Colt (400,000), Ithaca Gun Company (400,000), Union Switch & Signal (50,000), and Singer (500).  New M1911A1 pistols were given a parkerized metal finish instead of bluing, and the wood grip panels were replaced with panels made of brown plastic. The M1911A1 was a favored small arm of both US and allied military personnel during the war, in particular, the pistol was prized by some British commando units and Britain's highly covert Special Operations Executive, as well as South African Commonwealth forces.

The M1911A1 pistol was produced in very large quantities during the war. At the end of hostilities the government cancelled all contracts for further production and made use of existing stocks of weapons to equip personnel. Many of these weapons had seen service use, and had to be rebuilt and refinished prior to being issued. From the mid-1920s to the mid-1950s thousands of 1911s and 1911A1s were refurbished at U.S. arsenals and service depots. These rebuilds consisted of anything from minor inspections to major overhauls. Pistols that were refurbished at government arsenals will usually be marked on the frame/receiver with the arsenal's initials, such as RIA for Rock Island Armory or SA for Springfield Armory. 

Among collectors today, the Singer-produced pistols in particular are highly prized, commanding high prices even in poor condition.

General Officer's Model

From 1943 to 1945 a fine-grade russet-leather M1916 pistol belt set was issued to some generals in the US Army. It was composed of a leather belt, leather enclosed flap-holster with braided leather tie-down leg strap, leather two-pocket magazine pouch, and a rope lanyard. The metal buckle and fittings were in gilded brass. The buckle had the seal of the U.S. on the center (or "male") piece and a laurel wreath on the circular (or "female") piece. The pistol was a standard-issue M1911A1 that came with a cleaning kit and three magazines.

From 1972 to 1981 a modified M1911A1 called the RIA M15 General Officer's Model was issued to general officers in the US Army and US Air Force. From 1982 to 1986 the regular M1911A1 was issued. Both came with a black leather belt, open holster with retaining strap, and a two-pocket magazine pouch. The metal buckle and fittings were similar to the M1916 General Officer's Model except it came in gold metal for the Army and in silver metal for the Air Force.

Post–World War II usage
After World War II, the M1911 continued to be a mainstay of the U.S. Armed Forces in the Korean War and the Vietnam War, where it was used extensively by tunnel rats. It was used during Desert Storm in specialized U.S. Army units and U.S. Navy Mobile Construction Battalions (Seabees), and has seen service in both Operation Iraqi Freedom and Operation Enduring Freedom, with U.S. Army Special Forces Groups and Marine Corps Force Reconnaissance Companies.

However, by the late 1970s, the M1911A1 was acknowledged to be showing its age. Under political pressure from Congress to standardize on a single modern pistol design, the U.S. Air Force ran a Joint Service Small Arms Program to select a new semi-automatic pistol using the NATO-standard 9mm Parabellum pistol cartridge. After trials, the Beretta 92S-1 was chosen. The Army contested this result and subsequently ran its own competition in 1981, the XM9 trials, eventually leading to the official adoption of the Beretta 92F on January 14, 1985. By the late 1980s production was ramping up despite a controversial XM9 retrial and a separate XM10 reconfirmation that was boycotted by some entrants of the original trials, cracks in the frames of some pre-M9 Beretta-produced pistols, and despite a problem with slide separation using higher-than-specified-pressure rounds that resulted in injuries to some U.S. Navy special operations operatives. This last issue resulted in an updated model that includes additional protection for the user, the 92FS, and updates to the ammunition used.  During the Gulf War of 1990–1991, M1911A1s were deployed with reserve component U.S. Army units sent to participate in Operations Desert Shield and Desert Storm.

By the early 1990s, most M1911A1s had been replaced by the Beretta M9, though a limited number remain in use by special units. The U.S. Marine Corps (USMC) in particular were noted for continuing the use of M1911 pistols for selected personnel in MEU(SOC) and reconnaissance units (though the USMC also purchased over 50,000 M9 pistols.) For its part, the United States Special Operations Command (USSOCOM) issued a requirement for a .45 ACP pistol in the Offensive Handgun Weapon System (OHWS) trials. This resulted in the Heckler & Koch OHWS becoming the MK23 Mod 0 Offensive Handgun Weapon System (itself being heavily based on the 1911's basic field strip), beating the Colt OHWS, a much-modified M1911. Dissatisfaction with the stopping power of the 9 mm Parabellum cartridge used in the Beretta M9 has actually promoted re-adoption of pistols based on the .45 ACP cartridge such as the M1911 design, along with other pistols, among USSOCOM units in recent years, though the M9 has been predominant both within SOCOM and in the U.S. military in general. Both U.S. Army Special Forces Units and SFOD-D continue to use modernized M1911s, such as the M45 MEU(SOC) and a modified version of the Colt Rail Gun (a 1911 model with an integrated picatinny rail on the underside of the frame) designated as the M45A1 CQBP (Close Quarters Battle Pistol).

Design

Browning's basic M1911 design has seen very little change throughout its production life. The basic principle of the pistol is recoil operation. As the expanding combustion gases force the bullet down the barrel, they give reverse momentum to the slide and barrel which are locked together during this portion of the firing cycle. After the bullet has left the barrel, the slide and barrel continue rearward a short distance.

At this point, a link pivots the rear of the barrel down, out of locking recesses in the slide, and the barrel is stopped by making contact with the lower barrel lugs against the frame.  As the slide continues rearward, a claw extractor pulls the spent casing from the firing chamber and an ejector strikes the rear of the case, pivoting it out and away from the pistol through the ejection port. The slide stops its rearward motion then, and is propelled forward again by the recoil spring to strip a fresh cartridge from the magazine and feed it into the firing chamber. At the forward end of its travel, the slide locks into the barrel and is ready to fire again. However, if the fired round was the last round in the magazine, the slide will lock in the rearward position, which notifies the shooter to reload by ejecting the empty magazine and inserting a loaded magazine, and facilitates (by being rearwards) reloading the chamber, which is accomplished by either pulling the slide back slightly and releasing, or by pushing down on the slide stop, which releases the slide to move forward under spring pressure, strip a fresh cartridge from the magazine and feed it into the firing chamber.

There are no fasteners of any type in the 1911 design, besides the grip screws. The main components of the gun are held in place by the force of the main spring. The pistol can be "field stripped" by partially retracting the slide, removing the slide stop, and subsequently removing the barrel bushing. Full disassembly (and subsequent reassembly) of the pistol to its component parts can be accomplished using several manually removed components as tools to complete the disassembly.

The military mandated a grip safety and a manual safety. A grip safety, sear disconnect, slide stop, half cock position, and manual safety (located on the left rear of the frame) are on all standard M1911A1s. Several companies have developed a firing pin block safety. Colt's 80 series uses a trigger operated one and several other manufacturers, including Kimber and Smith & Wesson, use a Swartz firing-pin safety, which is operated by the grip safety. Language cautioning against pulling the trigger with the second finger was included in the initial M1911 manual and later manuals up to the 1940s.

The same basic design has been offered commercially and has been used by other militaries. In addition to the .45 ACP (Automatic Colt Pistol), models chambered for .38 Super, 9×19mm Parabellum, 7.65mm Parabellum, 9mm Steyr, .400 Corbon, and other cartridges were offered. The M1911 was developed from earlier Colt semi-automatic designs, firing rounds such as .38 ACP. The design beat out many other contenders during the government's selection period, during the late 1890s and early 1900s, up to the pistol's adoption. The M1911 officially replaced a range of revolvers and pistols across branches of the U.S. armed forces, though a number of other designs have seen use in certain niches.

Despite being challenged by newer and lighter weight pistol designs in .45 caliber, such as the Glock 21, the SIG Sauer P220, the Springfield XD and the Heckler & Koch USP, the M1911 shows no signs of decreasing popularity and continues to be widely present in various competitive matches such as those of USPSA, IDPA, IPSC, and Bullseye.

Versions

M45 MEU(SOC)

In 1986, the USMC Precision Weapon Section (PWS) at Marine Corps Base Quantico began customizing M1911A1s for reconnaissance units. The units served in a new Marine Corps program Marine expeditionary unit (special operations capable) (MEU(SOC)). The pistol was designated the M45 MEU(SOC). Hand-selected Colt M1911A1 frames were gutted, deburred and were then assembled with after-market grip safeties, ambidextrous thumb safeties, triggers, improved high-visibility sights, accurized barrels, grips, and improved Wilson magazines. These hand-made pistols were tuned to specifications and preferences of end users. 

In the late 1980s, the Marines laid out a series of specifications and improvements to make Browning's design ready for 21st-century combat, many of which have been included in MEU(SOC) pistol designs, but design and supply time was limited.  Discovering that the Los Angeles Police Department was pleased with their special Kimber M1911 pistols, a single source request was issued to Kimber for just such a pistol despite the imminent release of their TLE/RLII models. Kimber shortly began producing a limited number of what would be later termed the Interim Close Quarters Battle pistol (ICQB). Maintaining the simple recoil assembly, 5-inch barrel (though using a stainless steel match grade barrel), and internal extractor, the ICQB is not much different from Browning's original design.

M45A1
In July 2012, the USMC awarded Colt a $22.5 million contract for up to 12,000 M45A1 pistols with an initial order of 4036 pistols to replace the M45 MEU(SOC) pistol. The Marine Corps issued the M45A1 to Force Reconnaissance companies, Marine Corps Special Operations Command (MARSOC) and Special Reaction Teams from the Provost Marshal’s Office. The new 1911 was designated M45A1 or "Close Quarters Battle Pistol" CQBP. The M45A1 features a dual recoil spring assembly, Picatinny rails and is cerakoted tan in color. 

In 2019, the USMC selected the SIG Sauer M18 to replace the M45A1. The Marines began the roll out of the M18 in 2020.

Civilian models

Colt Commander: In 1949 Colt began production of the Colt Commander, an aluminum-framed 1911 with a  inch barrel and a rounded hammer. It was developed in response to an Army requirement issued in 1949, for a lighter replacement for the M1911 pistol, for issue to officers.  In 1970, Colt introduced the all-steel "Colt Combat Commander", with an optional model in satin nickel. To differentiate between the two models, the aluminum-framed model was renamed the "Lightweight Commander".
Colt Government Mk. IV Series 70 (1970–1983): Introduced the accurized Split Barrel Bushing (collet bushing). The first 1000 prototypes in the serial number range 35800NM–37025NM were marked BB on the barrel and the slide. Commander-sized pistols retained the solid bushing.
Colt Government Mk. IV Series 80 (1983–present): Introduced an internal firing pin safety and a new half-cock notch on the sear; pulling the trigger on these models while at half-cock will cause the hammer to drop. Models after 1988 returned to the solid barrel bushing due to concerns about breakages of collet bushings.
Colt Gold Cup National Match 1911/Mk. IV Series 70/Mk. IV Series 80 MKIV/Series 70 Gold Cup 75th Anniversary National Match/Camp Perry 1978. Limited to 200 pistols. (1983–1996) Gold Cup MKIV Series 80 National Match: .45 ACP, Colt-Elliason adjustable rear sight, fully adjustable Bomar-Style rear sight, target post front sight, spur hammer, wide target trigger, lowered and flared ejection port, National Match barrel, beveled top slide, wrap-around rubber stocks with nickel medallion.
Colt 1991 Series (1991–2001 ORM; 2001–present NRM): A hybrid of the M1911A1 military model redesigned to use the slide of the Mk. IV Series 80; these models aimed at providing a more "mil-spec" pistol to be sold at a lower price than Colt's other 1911 models in order to compete with imported pistols from manufacturers such as Springfield Armory and Norinco. The 1991–2001 model used a large "M1991A1" roll mark engraved on the slide. The 2001 model introduced a new "Colt's Government Model" roll mark engraving. The 1991 series incorporates full-sized blued and stainless models in either .45 ACP or .38 Super, as well as blued and stainless Commander models in .45 ACP.

Custom models
Since its inception, the M1911 has lent itself to easy customization. Replacement sights, grips, and other aftermarket accessories are the most commonly offered parts. Since the 1950s and the rise of competitive pistol shooting, many companies have been offering the M1911 as a base model for major customization. These modifications can range from changing the external finish, checkering the frame, to hand fitting custom hammers, triggers, and sears. Some modifications include installing compensators and the addition of accessories such as tactical lights and even scopes. A common modification of John Browning's design is to use a full-length guide rod that runs the full length of the recoil spring. This adds weight to the front of the pistol, but does not increase accuracy, and does make the pistol slightly more difficult to disassemble. Custom guns can cost over $5,000 and are built from scratch or on existing base models. Some notable companies offering custom M1911s include Dan Wesson Firearms, Les Baer, Nighthawk Custom, Springfield Custom Shop, Fusion Firearms  and Wilson Combat. IPSC models are offered by BUL Armory, Strayer Voigt Inc (Infinity Firearms).

Users

Current users in the U.S.
Many military and law enforcement organizations in the U.S. and other countries continue to use (often modified) M1911A1 pistols including Los Angeles Police Department SWAT and S.I.S., the FBI Hostage Rescue Team, FBI regional SWAT teams, and 1st Special Forces Operational Detachment—Delta (Delta Force).

The M1911A1 is popular among the general public in the U.S. for practical and recreational purposes. The pistol is commonly used for concealed carry thanks in part to a single-stack magazine (which makes for a thinner pistol that is, therefore, easier to conceal), personal defense, target shooting, and competition as well as collections. Numerous aftermarket accessories allow users to customize the pistol to their liking. There are a growing number of manufacturers of M1911-style pistols and the model continues to be quite popular for its reliability, simplicity, and patriotic appeal. Various tactical, target and compact models are available. Price ranges from a low end of around $400 for basic models imported from Turkey (TİSAŞ and GİRSAN) and the Philippines (Armscor, Metro Arms, and SAM Inc.) to more than $4,000 for the best competition or tactical versions (Wilson Combat, Ed Brown, Les Baer, Nighthawk Custom, and Staccato).

Due to an increased demand for M1911 pistols among Army Special Operations units, who are known to field a variety of M1911 pistols, the U.S. Army Marksmanship Unit began looking to develop a new generation of M1911s and launched the M1911-A2 project in late 2004. The goal was to produce a minimum of seven variants with various sights, internal and external extractors, flat and arched mainspring housings, integral and add-on magazine wells, a variety of finishes and other options, with the idea of providing the end-user a selection from which to select the features that best fit their missions. The AMU performed a well-received demonstration of the first group of pistols to the Marine Corps at Quantico and various Special Operations units at Ft. Bragg and other locations. The project provided a feasibility study with insight into future projects. Models were loaned to various Special Operations units, the results of which are classified. An RFP was issued for a Joint Combat Pistol but it was ultimately canceled. Currently units are experimenting with an M1911 pistol in .40 S&W, which will incorporate lessons learned from the A2 project. Ultimately, the M1911A2 project provided a testbed for improving existing M1911s. An improved M1911 variant becoming available in the future is a possibility.

The Springfield Custom Professional Model 1911A1 pistol is produced under contract by Springfield Armory for the FBI regional SWAT teams and the Hostage Rescue Team. This pistol is made in batches on a regular basis by the Springfield Custom Shop, and a few examples from most runs are made available for sale to the general public at a selling price of approximately US$2,700 each.

International users

The Brazilian company IMBEL (Indústria de Material Bélico do Brasil) still produces the pistol in several variants for civilian, military and law enforcement uses in .45 ACP, .40 S&W, .380 ACP and 9 mm calibers. IMBEL also produces for US civilian market as the supplier to Springfield Armory.
The Chinese Arms manufacturer, Norinco, exports a clone of the M1911A1 for civilian purchase as the M1911A1 and the high-capacity NP-30, as well 9mm variants the NP-28 and NP-29. China has also manufactured conversion kits to chamber the 7.62×25mm Tokarev round following the Korean War. As of 2013, the pistol is made under license instead of copying with Colt manufacturing machinery, due to an agreement between Norinco and Colt in order to stop Norinco from producing the Norinco CQ rifle. Importation into the United States was blocked by trade rules in 1993 but Norinco still manages to import the weapon into Canada and successfully adopted by IPSC shooters, gunsmiths and firearms enthusiasts there because of the cheaper price of the pistol than the other M1911s.
The German Volkssturm used captured M1911s at the end of World War II under the weapon code P.660(a), in which the letter 'a' refers to "Amerika", the weapon's country of origin.
Norway used the Kongsberg Colt which was a license-produced variant and is identified by the unique slide catch. Many Spanish firearms manufacturers produced pistols derived from 1911, such as the STAR Model B, the ASTRA 1911PL, and the Llama Model IX, to name just a few. 
Argentine Navy received 1,721 M1911 between 1914 and 1919. 21,616 were received for Argentine Armed Forces between 1914 and 1941. Later, some ex-US Navy Colts were transferred with ex-US ships. Argentina produced under license some 102,494 M1911A1s as Model 1927 Sistema Colt, which eventually led to production of the cheaper Ballester–Molina, which resembles the 1911.
The Armed Forces of the Philippines issues Mil-spec M1911A1 pistols as a sidearm to the special forces, military police, and officers. These pistols are mostly produced by Colt, though some of them are produced locally by Armscor, a Philippine company specialized in making 1911-style pistols.
The Indonesian Army issued a locally produced version of the Colt M1911A1, chambered in .45 ACP along with the Pindad P1, the locally manufactured Browning Hi-Power pistol as the standard-issue sidearm.
In the 1950s, the Republic of China Army (Taiwan) used original M1911A1s, and the batches are now still used by some forces. In 1962, Taiwan copied the M1911A1 as the T51 pistol, and it saw limited use in the Army. After that, the T51 was improved and introduced for export as the T51K1. Now the pistols in service are replaced by locally-made Beretta 92 pistols- the T75 pistol.
The Royal Thai Army and Royal Thai Police uses the Type 86, the Thai copy of the M1911 chambered in the .45 ACP round,
The Turkish Land Forces uses "MC 1911" Girsan made copy of M1911.
Numbers of Colt M1911s were used by the Royal Navy as sidearms during World War I in .455 Webley Automatic caliber. The pistols were then transferred to the Royal Air Force where they saw use in limited numbers up until the end of World War II as sidearms for aircrew in event of bailing out in enemy territory. The weapon also found use among the British airborne, commandos, Special Air Service, and Special Operations Executive 
Some units of the South Korean Air Force still use these original batches as officers' sidearms.

Current

: 16,880 pistols received, mostly from 1937 to 1941. The Brazilian Army uses a version of the M1911 developed by IMBEL chambered in 9×19mm Parabellum and designated M973.

: Used by the Chilean Marine Corps in security tasks.

 used by both Sa'ka Forces and Unit 777

: Used by Police Special Forces.

: Lithuanian Armed Forces
: In service with PGK special forces of the Royal Malaysian Police
: 5,400 M1911s and M1911A1s were acquired from 1922 to 1941.

: Local copies used by North Korean Special forces and Presidential Guard.

 (Taiwan)

: The Armed Forces was equipped with 4,603 M1911A1s before the Korean War, and 6,604 were in service with the Army by the end of the war. Also manufactured around 500 clone variant Type Independence (aka Busanjin Colt) from 1950 to 1951 at Busanjin Ironworks. Currently mostly used by the Navy while a limited number is used by the Special Warfare Command.
: Made under license. Known as the "Type 86" pistol.

: Former standard-issue service pistol of the U.S. Armed Forces and is in use by some U.S. Special Operations troops. The pistol is in service with various law enforcement agencies across the U.S.
: Local copies chambered in 7.62×25mm Tokarev and captured US M1911A1s in .45 ACP used by the Viet Cong and the North Vietnamese Army during Vietnam War.

Former

: Manufactured M1911 pistols under license from 1945 to 1966 by Dirección General de Fabricaciones Militares.

: In both World Wars, Canadian officers had the option of privately purchasing their own sidearm and the M1911/M1911A1 was a popular choice. The joint Canadian-US First Special Service Force (aka "The Devil's Brigade") also used American infantry weapons, including the M1911A1.

: replaced by USP pistols
: used by the Kagnew Battalion
: About 51,000 bought by Russian military from United States in years 1915–1917. But only relatively small number of these captured pistols ended up to hands of authorities after Finnish Civil War. Finnish military had about 120 pistols during World War 2, most of them were issued to field army.
: 5,500 M1911 received during World War I, especially for tank units, officers and trench raiders. Free French Forces received 19,325 Colts. Known in French service as Pistolet automatique 11 mm 4 (C.45) (Automatic pistol 11.4mm (calibre .45)). Both M1911 and M1911A1 pistols were used.

: Received M1911A1s from US during Laotian Civil War (1955-1975).
: In service with 1st Artillery Battalion 1963–1967.
: Used captured pistols during World War II.
: Used during WWII
: After World War II, the Japan Self-Defense Forces and Police were provided 101,700 M1911A1s from the US. These were used until the 1980s.
: 50 received during World War I
: 700 received during World War I Produced under license as Kongsberg Colt.
: Used by the Panama Defense Forces
: Polish Armed Forces in the West used pistols during World War II.
: 51,000 purchased between February 1916 and January 1917
 Shanghai International Settlement: Colt M1911 and M1911A1s were used by non-Chinese members of the Shanghai Municipal Police from 1926

: Some M1911 pistols were captured during Allied intervention in the Russian Civil War and used in Red Army. Extra 12,977 pistols were received as Lend-Lease during World War II. 
: Some M1911s chambered for .455 Webley Automatic were supplied to the Royal Flying Corps during WWI. Saw service among elite and special forces during WWII in .45 and .455. Possibly still in use by UKSF.
 Viet Cong: Crude clones used by VC guerrillas with some captured in the Vietnam War.

State firearm
On March 18, 2011, the U.S. state of Utah—as a way of honoring M1911 designer John Browning, who was born and raised in the state—adopted the Browning M1911 as the "official firearm of Utah".

Similar pistols
AMT Hardballer
Ballester–Molina
Kimber Custom
Kongsberg Colt
M15 pistol
Obregón pistol
FB Vis 
Rock Island Armory 1911 
Ruger SR1911 
Sig Sauer 1911 
Smith & Wesson SW1911 
Springfield Armory 911 
Springfield Armory EMP 
Star Model BM

See also
List of U.S. Army weapons by supply catalog designation (SNL B-6)
Solid Concepts 1911DMLS
Table of handgun and rifle cartridges

References

Further reading

Meadows, Edward S. U.S. Military Automatic Pistols: 1894–1920. Richard Ellis Publications, 1993.
The Bluejackets' Manual, 12th edition. Annapolis, MD: United States Naval Institute, 1944.
 Official U.S. Army description of the original Model 1911 pistol and its .45 ACP ammunition.

External links

Colt Model 1911 page on Sam Lisker's Colt Automatic Pistols site (coltautos.com)
The M1911 Magazine FAQ
The Thompson-LaGarde Cadaver Tests of 1904
M1911 Pistols Organization main page, Detailed animated drawing of all operational parts and Syd's 1911 Notebook on M1911.org
Exploded-View Diagram of an M1911 from American Rifleman
Black Army Colt 1911
Colt Model 1911A1 pistol (infographic tech. drawing)

1911 platform
.45 ACP semi-automatic pistols
Colt semi-automatic pistols
Semi-automatic pistols of the United States
World War I infantry weapons of the United States
World War II infantry weapons of the United States
Cold War firearms of the United States
Firearms by John Browning
Weapons of the Philippine Army
Weapons and ammunition introduced in 1911
Springfield firearms
Police weapons